Generationwhy is the debut studio album by American electronic music producer Zhu, released on July 29, 2016 by Columbia Records. The album features works and vocals from the likes of Maya Angelou, Jaymes Young, Nylo, Mitch Bell, Nikola Bedingfield, Adam Schmalholz, and Broods. The album followed after the success of ZHU's collaborative debut EP Genesis Series, released in 2015.

Critical reception

Upon release, Generationwhy received mixed reviews. The Guardian found Generationwhy an "at times, beguiling blend of mid-tempo electronic pop." Noting that ZHU successfully assimilated a lot of current Balearic dance music "influences into something distinctly his own", the review also argued that not all the songs transcended "the tropes of the genre that inspired them." Drowned in Sound was somewhat less impressed: "The album is essentially a series of enjoyable yet unremarkable house-pop songs." That being said the reviewer found some redeeming qualities, "Unlike many of these artists, Zhu includes what might be a surprising amount of 'live' instrumentation which generally add to the noir feeling."

Commercial performance
The album debuted at number 109 on the Billboard 200, selling 3,000 copies in its first week. It also debuted at number one on the Dance/Electronic Albums chart in the United States.

Track listing

Notes
 "Intro (Neon City)" features uncredited spoken word from poetic writer Maya Angelou.
 "Cold Blooded" features uncredited vocals from Jaymes Young.
 "In the Morning" features sampled lyrics from "Touch Me" by Rui da Silva.
 "Secret Weapon" features uncredited vocals from Nylo.
 "Palm of My Hand" features uncredited spoken word from Valentine Baran.
 "Reaching" features uncredited vocals from Nikola Bedingfield.
 "Hometown Girl" features uncredited vocals from Jaymes Young.
 "Good Life" features uncredited spoken word from Adam Schmalholz and uncredited vocals from Broods.

Charts

References

2016 debut albums
Zhu (musician) albums
Columbia Records albums